Clarabridge is an American software company. It was founded in 2006 in Reston, Virginia. Clarabridge offers customer experience software as a service (SaaS) using AI-powered text and speech analytics. The data typically used for analysis comes from social media (such as Facebook, Twitter, or review sites), call center notes, email, chats, and surveys.  Using natural language processing and other patented technology, the software is used in voice of the customer, customer experience management and customer feedback programs. Clarabridge was acquired by Qualtrics in October of 2021.

Company milestones

 October, 2005:  Clarabridge is incorporated
 November, 2008: First Clarabridge Customer Connections User Conference (C3)
 March, 2011: EMEA (Europe, Middle East, and Africa) Office Opens in London
 December, 2011:  One Billion Verbatim Processed
 August, 2012: Two Billion Verbatim Processed
 September, 2012: Clarabridge Culture/Social Inclusion Club Founded
 February, 2013: Clarabridge opens office in San Francisco
 September, 2013: $80M in Series D Funding
 April, 2014: Acquisition of Market Metrix
 April, 2015: Acquisition of Engagor
 March, 2018: Clara-Ladies Founded
 July, 2018: Clarabridge Announces Support for WhatsApp Business
 July, 2020: Clarabridge Introduces Intelligent Scoring (patent pending) 
 October, 2020: Clarabridge Launches Integration with Microsoft Dynamics 365 Customer Voice and Dynamics 365 
 October, 2020: Clarabridge Launches Partnership with Facebook
 October, 2021: Qualtrics completes acquisition of Clarabridge

References

Software companies based in Virginia